Patrick Boland was an Irish politician and farmer. He was first elected to Dáil Éireann as a Fianna Fáil Teachta Dála (TD) for the Leix–Offaly constituency at the June 1927 general election. He was re-elected at each subsequent general election until he retired from politics at the 1954 general election.

References

Year of birth missing
Year of death missing
Fianna Fáil TDs
Members of the 5th Dáil
Members of the 6th Dáil
Members of the 7th Dáil
Members of the 8th Dáil
Members of the 9th Dáil
Members of the 10th Dáil
Members of the 11th Dáil
Members of the 12th Dáil
Members of the 13th Dáil
Members of the 14th Dáil
20th-century Irish farmers